Moronga, rellena, or morcilla is a kind of blood sausage. It is found in Argentina, Cuba, Colombia, Puerto Rico, Central America, and Mexican cuisine. Spices, herbs (such as ruta, oregano, and mint), onions and chili peppers are added and then boiled in the pig's large intestines for casing for several hours. It is served in a sauce, either "chile rojo" or "chile verde". It is also served in central Mexico as a filling in gorditas and tacos after it has been pan-fried with fresh onions and jalapeño peppers. This sausage is called "morcilla" in the Yucatan Peninsula, and it is almost always served along with other sausages (buche) and a mix of pickled onion, cilantro, and spices.

See also
 Black pudding
 Blood as food
 List of sausages

References

Flavored memories

Argentine cuisine
Blood sausages
Central American cuisine
Cuban sausages
Mexican cuisine
Colombian cuisine
Mexican sausages
Puerto Rican cuisine